The East Indians, also called East Indian Catholics or Bombay East Indians, are an ethno-religious Indian Christian community native to the Seven Islands of Bombay and the neighbouring Mumbai Metropolitan Area of the Konkan division.

History

Pre-Portuguese era 
A Dominican missionary by the name Jordanus Catalani, who was either Catalan or Occitan (southern French), began evangelising the locals in Sopara, Thana & Kalyan-Dombivli towns of north Konkan in around 1323 AD. Sopara was an ancient port and an international trading center.

Portuguese era 

After ushering in the Age of Discovery, Portuguese Armadas under the command of Vasco Da Gama found their way to India in 1498 via the Cape Route. In the next few years they acquired many colonial possessions in what would become the Portuguese East Indies; their main aims were to capitalise on the spice trade and promotion of Christian missions to convert indigenous peoples, for which the Primate of the East Indies was founded. Although Brahmins and other high-caste Hindus were ceremoniously converted by the Portuguese Church, and were treated with favour and distinction, most of them continued to engage in agriculture, fishing, and other rural occupations handed down by their ancestors, and received neither secular nor religious education. Among the converts were a number of descendants of the Ancient Indian Christian community reportedly founded by Bartholomew the Apostle. They coalesced into a community under Portuguese rule known as Norteiros and later as "Portuguese Christians" or "Bombay Portuguese" in British Bombay.

The Franciscans spearheaded the evangelisation of the "Province of the North" headquartered at Fort San Sebastian of Bassein, but the fort's officials were subordinate to the viceroy in the capital of Velha Goa. From 1534 to 1552, a priest by the name António do Porto converted over 10,000 people, built a dozen churches, convents, and a number of orphanages hospitals and seminaries. Prominent among the converts were two yogis from the Kanheri Caves who became known as Paulo Raposo and Francisco de Santa Maria. They introduced Christianity to their fellow yogis, converting many in the process. Another notable convert during this period was the Brahmin astrologer Parashuram Joshi, who was baptized on 8 September 1565 with the name Henrique da Cunha. Joshi's conversion was followed by that of 250 Hindus, including over 50 Brahmins. In Salsette, the priest Manuel Gomes converted over 6,000 Hindus in Bandra and was known as the Apostle of Salsette.

In 1573, 1,600 people were converted. Beginning in 1548, Jesuits in Bassein (Baçaim) and Bandra converted many upper-caste Hindus; Bassein  recorded 9,400 baptisms in 1588. The Jesuit superior Gonçalo Rodrigues baptised between 5,000 and 6,000 Hindus in Thane (Tana), many of whom were orphans or the young children of lower-caste Hindus who were sold by their parents. In 1634, Bassein had sixty-three friars, thirty Franciscans, fifteen Jesuits, ten Dominicans, and eight Augustines. By the end of the 16th century the Catholic population of the Portuguese Province of the North was 10,000 to 15,000, centered mainly in and around Bassein.

After the Province of the North came under Maratha occupation in 1739 and Catholicism was under severe threat from the Brahmin Peshwas, the native East Indian clergy under the Vicar General at Kurla managed and nursed the community back to a flourishing population in British Bombay.

British and modern eras 

Changes occurred under British rule. On 11 May 1661, the Marriage Treaty of Charles Stuart II of England and Catherine de Braganza, daughter of John IV of Portugal gave Bombay to the British Empire as intended, since the British takeover of Surat (allegedly as part of Catherine's dowry to Charles). A weakened Portugal, no longer a part of the Crown of Spain, had to oblige. Nevertheless, parts of present-day Bombay (such as Bandra, Thane and Vasai) remained Portuguese well into the first third of the 18th century. Since the early days of the English East India Company, there were no other Indian Christians in the North Konkan except the East Indian Catholics. Employment intended for Christians was monopolised by the East Indians. With railways and steamships came immigrants from Goa who were also called "Portuguese Christians". The British adopted a designation which would distinguish
the Christians of North Konkan who were British subjects, from the Goan Catholics who were Portuguese subjects, (the Mangalorean Catholics were no longer Portuguese subjects). For Victoria I's Golden Jubilee, the Christians of North Konkan changed their name from "Portuguese Christians" to "East Indians" to impress upon the British in Bombay, that they were the earliest British subjects in India, and were entitled to certain natural rights and privileges in comparison with immigrants.

The Bombay East Indian Association was founded on 26 May 1887 to advance the education, employment, rights and economic development of the East Indians. P F Gomes, who was knighted by Pope Leo XIII in 1888, was its first president and J L Britto its first secretary. D G D'Almeida donated  to establish an education fund.

During the 1960s, the Archdiocese of Bombay estimated that there were 92,000 East Indians in Bombay: 76,000 in suburban Bombay and 16,000 in the city.

Architecture 
A typical Koli house consists of a veranda, used for repairing nets and receiving visitors; a sitting-room, used by women for household work; a kitchen, a central apartment, a bedroom, a devotional room and a detached bathroom.

Language and literature 
East Indian Catholics speak a dialect of Marathi, which they retained despite Portuguese influence. The Marathi language is central to the community's identity. The author of Trans. Bomb. Geog. Soc., 1836–38, Vol. I. mentions the dialect of Marathi spoken by the East Indians of Salsette, Mahim, Matunga and Mazgaon, similar to the language spoken by the Kulbis, Kolis, Bhandaris, Palshes, Pathare Prabhus, Somvanshi Kshatriya Pathares (Panchkalshis), Kuparis and Vadvals; this may have been Konkani. Some East Indian upper-class families in the Khatri ward of Thane speak Portuguese. 110 Portuguese lexical items are found in Marathi.

Traditions and festivals 

Although the East Indians have preserved their pre-Christian Marathi culture and traditions, many Portuguese influences have been absorbed.

Dress 

Traditional dress for women is the lugra. For men, traditional wear consists of khaki shorts and a white banian. A Koli Christian bridegroom usually wears an older Portuguese admiral's uniform, which is preserved and lent out for such occasions.
East Indian women wore a blouse and cotton lugra, with the back pleats tucked into the waist; women did not use the upper portion of the sari (covering the head and breast) until they were married. , a cylindrical style, is popular with young girls and women.

Film industry 
The film Tu Maza Jeev, in the East Indian language, was released on Maharashtra Day in 2009.

In literature 
Many of the characters in the book Bloodline Bandra by Godfrey Joseph Pereira (2014), are East Indian, including the protagonist, journalist, David Cabral. The book itself is set in the 1950's with the first half of the book having most of the action in Pali Village, a predominantly East Indian populace at the time.

Singing competition 

East Indians organise singing competitions in their own language. The competition is primarily held in the evening of important village occasions; for example, Kurla has an annual competition on the eve of the  feast in May at Holy Cross Church.

Representation and reservation 
The East Indians were awarded the OBC (other backward Class) status by the Government of Maharashtra on 1 March 2006 by the way of official gazette. In Sept 2014, local non-governmental organisations such as the Watchdog Foundation, Mobai Gaothan Panchayat, the Bombay East Indian Association, Vakola Advanced Locality Management, Kalina Civic Forum& the Kolovery Welfare Association founded the Maharashtra Swaraj Party (MSP), to give voice to the demographically minor community's concerns and interests.
The party, which represents the East Indian community, was expected to support five candidates from Mumbai's suburbs in the 13th Maharashtra Legislative Assembly elections.

Notable East Indians 
Valentine Machado: East Indian singer
Gavin Ferreira: Olympic hockey player
Loy Mendonsa: Musician, part of the Shankar–Ehsaan–Loy trio
Gonsalo Garcia: Roman Catholic saint from India
James Ferreira: Indian fashion designer and son of hockey Olympian Owen Ferreira
Joseph Baptista: Indian freedom fighter
Luke Mendes: Filmmaker
Michael Ferreira: Amateur English billiards player
Owen Ferreira: Indian hockey Olympian
Joseph D'souza: First East Indian gazetted officer
Simon Pimenta: Archbishop Emeritus of Bombay
Mark Joseph Dharmai: Para-athlete (bronze medalist in the 2017 Doubles BWF Para-Badminton World Championships).

See also 

 Norteiro people
 Kupari
Portuguese Bombay and Bassein

Citations

References 

Christian communities of India
Ethnic groups in India
Ethnic groups in Mumbai
 
Social groups of Maharashtra
Other Backward Classes